This is a list of Pakistani administrative units by their gross state product (GSP) (the value of the total economy, and goods and services produced in the respective administrative unit) in nominal terms. GSP is the unit-level counterpart of the national gross domestic product (GDP), the most comprehensive measure of a country's economic activity.

Dynamics
Pakistan, in 2030, will have a (GDP Nominal) of around 1.0 trillion USD and (GDP PPP) of around 3.7 trillion USD, according to trading economics.  This value can be further divided into the unit levels (GSP), providing an outlook of how much value each unit contributes to the national GDP. 
Pakistan has traditionally followed a "top-down" approach in its analysis of economic development; that is, authorities have scarcely attempted to break up national GDP statistics into provincial and subnational units and have focused more on the federation as a whole.
Thus, many accounts of provincial GDPs that do exist have usually been projected estimates made by economists, based on the likely percentage of contribution of the respective units to the national GDP and some yearly studies. 
Punjab has the largest economy in Pakistan, contributing most to the national GDP. The province's economy has quadrupled since 1972.  Its share of Pakistan's GDP was 54.7% in 2000 and 59% as of 2010. Sindh which is the second largest province in terms of population and GDP which has steadily continued to grow.  It is featured well within the list of country subdivisions with a GDP (PPP) over $200 billion. Sindh's GDP is to a large extent influenced by the economy of Karachi.

Administrative units by GSP (nominal)
The following are the estimated figures of different provinces and autonomous regions of Pakistan as of 2023.

Administrative units by GSP (PPP)
Followings are the estimated figures of different provinces and autonomous regions of Pakistan as of 2022.

See also 
 List of administrative units of Pakistan by Human Development Index

References

Provinces by gross domestic product
Provinces by gross domestic product
Gross state product
Provinces by gross domestic product
Ranked lists of country subdivisions